"Ding Dong Song" is a song by Swedish pop singer Günther, featuring The Sunshine Girls, based on a 1984 Dutch hit called "Tralala" by Phil & Company. "Ding Dong Song" was released in 2004 on Günther's debut album, Pleasureman. The song was number one for three weeks on the Swedish music charts.

Background and recording
Günther's version is sung in English with a heavy German accent. The song is a parody of Eurodance genres, especially those from the 1980s and 1990s in Germany.

The song gained widespread popularity on YouTube. Examples of the most popular fan-made videos include US soldiers in Iraq dancing to the song, YouTube users in front of their computers lip-synching, and various edited parodies.

Chart performance

Weekly charts

Year-end charts

References

External links
Phil & Company - Tralala - A performance of Tralala, the song which Ding Dong Song is based on.

2004 singles
Günther (singer) songs
Eurodance songs
Number-one singles in Sweden
Viral videos
2004 songs
Songs written by Wrethov
Warner Records singles
Musical parodies